Victor Seddon Vincent (1 June 1908 – 9 November 1964) was an Australian politician. Born at Leonora, Western Australia, he was educated at Scotch College in Perth, and then the University of Western Australia, becoming a barrister. He practiced in Kalgoorlie from 1931. After serving in World War II (1939-1945), he was a member of Kalgoorlie Municipal Council, and President of the Kalgoorlie Chamber of Commerce. In 1949, he was elected to the Australian Senate as a Liberal Senator for Western Australia. He held the seat until his death in 1964; Peter Sim was appointed to replace him.

References

1908 births
1964 deaths
Liberal Party of Australia members of the Parliament of Australia
Members of the Australian Senate for Western Australia
Members of the Australian Senate
People from Leonora, Western Australia
University of Western Australia alumni
20th-century Australian politicians
People educated at Scotch College, Perth